Robert Richard Cornthwaite (born 24 October 1985), nicknamed "Cornflakes", is an Australian former soccer player. Alongside Eli Babalj and Sasa Ognenovski, Cornthwaite, at 1.95 m is the joint third tallest player to have represented the Australia national association football team, behind Zeljko Kalac (2.02 m) and Harry Souttar (1.98 m).

Club career

Adelaide United

Cornthwaite signed for United for the inaugural A-League season and spent the majority of his first two seasons starting on the bench. In the 2007–08 he started all of his 19 league appearances; he scored the opening goal in just the third minute against Pohang Steelers in Adelaide United's opening game of the 2008 Asian Champion League.

As of half time of Adelaide United's away game against J League 5-time champions Kashima Antlers in the quarter finals of the 2008 AFC Champions League, Robert scored an accidental own goal to put Kashima level with Adelaide 1–1 after a spectacular goal from Adelaide captain Travis Dodd which came after a cross from vice-captain Lucas Pantelis in the 38th minute. The match being the first leg of the 2 teams Quarter finals match dated on Wednesday 17 September in Japan. He redeemed himself though in the second leg where he scored the winner in the 73rd minute with the game locked at 0–0. Adelaide went on to win 2–1 on aggregate and advance to the semi-finals.

Robert Cornthwaite made his 50th A-League appearance in the 1–0 win over Perth Glory on 27 December 2008. Cornthwaite signed a new three-year contract with Adelaide United in October 2009.

Jeonnam Dragons 
On 8 March 2011, Cornthwaite announced that he had signed for Jeonnam Dragons in the Korean K-League on a 2-year contract.

Selangor 
Robert joined the Malaysian Super League outfit Selangor in early 2015 and scored a few goals for the club. He was selected to play for Malaysian XI in a friendly match against Tottenham Hotspur in July 2015.

In January 2016 his contract with Selangor was continued after Selangor fans forced the Football Association of Selangor to  continue his contract by using the social media.

On 9 July 2016, Cornthwaite was released by Selangor.

Western Sydney Wanderers 
On 14 July 2016, Cornthwaite joined Western Sydney Wanderers on a two-year deal.

Perak 
On 16 January 2018, Cornthwaite signed a contract with Malaysia Super League club Perak on a one plus one-year deal.

Cornthwaite announced his immediate retirement from football on 4 June 2018, halfway through his Perak contract.

International career
Cornthwaite made his first senior international debut for the Socceroos on 4 March 2009 in an AFC Asian Cup qualifying match versus Kuwait. He scored his first international goal in against South Korea in a 2012 friendly.

Career statistics

Club 

1 – includes A-League final series statistics
2 – includes FIFA Club World Cup statistics; AFC Champions League statistics are included in season commencing after group stages (i.e. 2008 ACL in 2008–09 A-League season etc.)

International

International goals

Honours

Club
Adelaide United
 A-League Premiership: 2005–06

Selangor
 Malaysia Cup: 2015

Personal life
Cornthwaite was born in Blackburn, England and was brought up in Adelaide, South Australia.

Cornthwaite has a wife, Nel, a son and a daughter, Sahara.

References

External links
 Adelaide United profile 
 FFA – Olyroo profile 
 

1985 births
Living people
Footballers from Blackburn
Association football fullbacks
English footballers
Australian soccer players
English expatriate footballers
Australian expatriate soccer players
Australia international soccer players
FFSA Super League players
Adelaide United FC players
FK Beograd (Australia) players
Jeonnam Dragons players
Selangor FA players
Western Sydney Wanderers FC players
Perak F.C. players
A-League Men players
K League 1 players
Expatriate footballers in South Korea
Australian people of English descent
English expatriate sportspeople in South Korea
Australian expatriate sportspeople in South Korea
Australian expatriate sportspeople in Malaysia
English expatriate sportspeople in Malaysia
Soccer players from Adelaide
Expatriate footballers in Malaysia